Noah Paul James (born 14 February 2001), is an Australian professional soccer player who plays as a goalkeeper for Newcastle Jets.

Club career

Newcastle Jets
James nearly featured as the substitute goalkeeper for Newcastle Jets in the 2018 A-League Grand Final, but was ineligible as he had not participated in the 2017–18 Y-League.

James and Jack Simmons signed senior scholarship contracts with the Jets in October 2018.

In July 2019, James was called up to the Australian under-20 side.

James was injured for several months at the start of 2020 after rupturing ligaments in his hand. He made his A-League debut for the Jets in a win over Wellington Phoenix in the Jets' final game of the 2019–20 A-League, earning praise from coach Carl Robinson.

Loan to Western Sydney Wanderers
On 30 December 2020, James was loaned to Western Sydney Wanderers for the 2020–21 A-League after extending his Newcastle Jets' contract by 3 years.

Loan to Dandenong Thunder
On 10 February 2022, James was loaned out to Dandenong Thunder SC for the 2022 NPL Victoria season.

Honours

International
Australia U20
AFF U-19 Youth Championship: 2019

Australia U17
AFF U-16 Youth Championship: 2016

References

External links

2001 births
Living people
Australian soccer players
Association football goalkeepers
Newcastle Jets FC players
Western Sydney Wanderers FC players
Dandenong Thunder SC players
National Premier Leagues players
A-League Men players